La Presse Médicale is a French peer-reviewed academic journal of medicine established in 1983. It is published by Elsevier, and is edited by Loic Guillevin and Frédérique Lesaulnier. An English supplement, Quarterly Medical Review, is published 4 times a year. In 2003, it merged with Annales de Médecine Interne, formerly known as Bulletins et Mémoires de la Société Médicale des Hôpitaux de Paris and Bulletin de la Société Médicale des Hôpitaux de Paris.

Abstracting and indexing
The journal is abstracted and indexed in the following bibliographic databases:

According to the Journal Citation Reports, the journal has a 2016 impact factor of 1.071.

References

External links

Publications established in 1983
French-language journals
Elsevier academic journals
General medical journals